Were you looking for:
St. Johns, Florida, an unincorporated community
 St. Johns County, Florida
 Port St. John, Florida
 St. Johns River in Florida
 St. John's Cathedral, Jacksonville